Vilkij District is in Namin County, Ardabil province, Iran. At the 2006 census, its population was 23,940 in 4,930 households. The following census in 2011 counted 24,960 people in 6,583 households. At the latest census in 2016, the district had 25,945 inhabitants living in 7,031 households.

References 

Namin County

Districts of Ardabil Province

Populated places in Ardabil Province

Populated places in Namin County